The Alice River is a river located on the Cape York Peninsula of Far North Queensland, Australia.

The headwaters of the river rise in the Great Dividing Range and flow westward down the valleys and across Aerodrome Plain where they turn south west forming braided channels. The river then turns northwest and continues forming the northern border of Mitchell-Alice Rivers National Park before discharging into Mitchell River. From source to mouth, the river is joined by twelve tributaries and descends  over its  course.

Vegetation across the catchment area is speargrass savannah dominated by Stringybark, Bloodwoods and Moreton Bay Ash. Along the river banks and tributaries there are open stands of paperbarks and dense riparian rainforest. The season swamps and lagoons have Melaleucas and Freshwater Mangrove with water lilies in standing water.

The river was named in circa 1886 by Frank Johnston, the manager of Koolata cattle station, after his wife Alice.

See also

References

Rivers of Far North Queensland